The Big Stone Gap Rebels were a minor league baseball team based in Big Stone Gap, Virginia. From 1949 to 1953, Big Stone Gap played exclusively as members of the Class D level Mountain States League, qualifying for the league playoffs in 1950 and 1952. The Big Stone Gap Rebels were a minor league affiliate of the New York Giants in 1952. Big Stone gap hosted home minor league games at Bullitt Park.

History
Minor league baseball began in Big Stone Gap, Virginia when the 1949 Big Stone Gap Rebels began play as members of the Class D level Mountain States League. The Big Stone Gap Rebels and Middlesboro Athletics joined the 1949 Mountain States League to form an eight–team league. The holdover Harlan Smokies, Hazard Bombers, Jenkins Cavaliers, Morristown Red Sox, Newport Canners and Pennington Gap Miners franchises completed the eight–team league.

The 1949 Big Stone Gap Rebels began play as members of the Mountain States League and failed to qualify for the playoffs. Big Stone Gap ended the 1949 season with a record of 55–70, to place 7th in the regular season standings, as Rudy Parsons, Dale Markert and Fred Marsh served as manager. The Rebels finished 28.5 games behind the 1st place Harlan Smokies in the regular season standings.

In 1950, the Big Stone Gap Rebels qualified for the Mountain States League playoffs. Big Stone Gap ended the 1950 season with a record of 75–51, placing 3rd in the regular season standings. Under manager Jack Rothrock, the Rebels finished 6.5 games behind the 1st place Harlan Smokies in the regular season standings. In the playoffs, the Harlan Smokies defeated the Big Stone Gap Rebels 3 games to 1. Michael Hudak of Big Stone Gap, led the league with a 21–3 pitching record.

The Big Stone Gap Rebels continued Mountain States League play in 1951 and missed the playoffs. Big Stone Gap ended the season with a record of 49–75, placing 7th. Ham Schulte and Lew Flick served as managers as the Rebels finished 43.0 games behind the Hazard Bombers in the regular season standings. After the 1951 season, both the Jenkins Cavaliers and Pennington Gap franchises folded and the Mountain States League reduced to six teams in 1952.

The 1952 Big Stone Gap Rebels became a minor league affiliate of the New York Giants. The Rebels ended the Mountain States League in 4th place and qualified for the playoffs. With a record of 57–60 under manager Leonard Cross, Stone Gap finished 29.0 games behind the 1st place Hazard Smokies in the six–team league regular season standings. In the playoffs, the Harlan Smokies defeated Big Stone Gap 3 games to 2. Len Cross of Big Stone Gap led the Mountain States with 40 home runs and 125 RBI.

In their final season of play, the Big Stone Gap Rebels did not qualify for the Mountain States League playoffs. The Rebels ended their final season with a record of 55–70, placing 6th in the eight–team league under manager Kelly Lunn. Big Stone Gap finished 23.5 games behind the 1st place Maryville-Alcoa Twins in the final standings.

The Big Stone Gap Rebels folded from the Mountain States League after the 1953 season. Big Stone Gap, Virginia has not hosted another minor league team.

The ballpark
The Big Stone Rebels hosted minor league home games at Bullitt Park. Today, Bullitt Park is still in use as a public park containing athletic facilities. The park is located at 217 East 1st Street North, Big Stone Gap, Virginia.

Timeline

Year–by–year records

Notable alumni

Bob Bowman (1950)
Lew Flick (1950), (1951, MGR)
Ham Schulte (1951, MGR)
Joe Shipley (1953)

See also
Big Stone Gap Rebels players

References

External link
Baseball Reference

Mountain States League (1948–1954) teams
Defunct baseball teams in Virginia
Baseball teams established in 1949
Baseball teams disestablished in 1953
Wise County, Virginia